The 1966 Dartmouth Indians football team was an American football team that represented Dartmouth College during the 1966 NCAA University Division football season. The Indians shared the championship of the Ivy League in a three-way tie.

In their tenth season under head coach Bob Blackman, the Indians compiled a 7–2 record and outscored opponents 273 to 131. William Calhoun was the team captain.

The Indians' 6–1 conference record earned a three-way tie for first place in the Ivy League standings. The Indians outscored Ivy opponents 250 to 117. Dartmouth defeated one of its co-champions, Princeton, and suffered its lone in-conference loss to the other co-champion, Harvard. 

Dartmouth played its home games at Memorial Field on the college campus in Hanover, New Hampshire.

Schedule

References

Dartmouth
Dartmouth Big Green football seasons
Ivy League football champion seasons
Dartmouth Indians football